The Piaggio Beverly is an open motorcycle produced by the Italian vehicle manufacturer Piaggio.

Model history 
Introduced in 2001, the Piaggio Beverly has been produced in engine sizes ranging from 125 to 500 cc. Early models were powered by Piaggio's water-cooled L.E.A.D.E.R. engine. 

In 2005 models with 250 cm³ and 500 cm³ displacement were also presented and the engine range was subsequently expanded to 300 cm³, 350 cm³ and 400 cm³ displacement. 

From 2006 all models have electronic injection (i.e.), no more carburetor. It comes in models Beverly and Beverly S. 

The body was redesigned for 2004 and again for 2009. The Beverly is now available as a Tourer or Cruiser. 

It also uses LED lighting and turn signals. The storage compartment underneath the seat holds two open helmets, and higher-powered models come standard with ABS.

Changing the master cylinder 
Since 2013, Piaggio has prescribed the change of the brakes master cylinder every 15,000 km on the Beverly 350. Due to the higher brake pressures in ABS brakes and the associated increased load on the installed cuffs, it is currently required in this system, these components regularly check, or replace, let, it is argued. The replacement of the master cylinder costs about 500 euros.

With the 2014 model year, the obligatory change of the master cylinder has been omitted.

New Beverly (2021–present) 
Twenty years on from its launch, the latest Piaggio Beverly arrives on the scene with plenty of upgrades, but still retains the same sporty no-nonsense attitude and elegant design.

Take a new Euro 5 compliant 300 or 400 cc HPE (High Performance Engine). Engine is single cylinder four-stroke, 4-valve, liquid-cooled with electronic injection delivers reduced noise and fuel consumption. 

The Piaggio claims that 300 cc HPE, has 23% more power and 16% extra torque over the previous model, and 400 cc HPE 17% more power and 30% extra torque than the previous 350 cc version, that delivers over 35 horsepower and is Euro 5 compliant.

The new “navigation bridge” houses a digital 5.5” LCD instrument panel in the centre, with ergonomically designed commands placed for maximum comfort on each side of the handlebar.

All lights and indicators used LED technology.

The trio colour schemes – glossy Bianco Luna (white), Blu Oxygen (metallic blue) and Grigio Cloud (metallic grey) – ooze elegance, pairing beautifully with the metallic finishing details and light grey rims.

Specification

Gallery

References

Beverly
Motor scooters
Motorcycles introduced in 2001